Resolute may refer to:

Geography
 Resolute, Nunavut, Canada, a hamlet
 Resolute Bay, Nunavut
 Resolute Mountain, Alberta, Canada

Military operations
 Operation Resolute, the Australian Defence Force contribution to patrolling Australia's Exclusive Economic Zone
 Operation Resolute (Balkans), the British portion of the NATO-led peacekeeping force in Bosnia and Herzegovina

Ships
 , various Royal Navy ships and other vessels
 , various US Navy ships, other vessels and a floating drydock
 USCGC Resolute (WMEC-620), a United States Coast Guard cutter
 USRC Resolute (1867), a revenue cutter of the United States Revenue Cutter Service in commission from 1867 to 1872
 CSS Resolute, a Confederate States Navy tugboat during the American Civil War
 , a Royal Canadian Navy minesweeper launched in 1953
  RCGS Resolute, an Antarctic and Arctic cruise ship
 Resolute (yacht), a contender in the 1920 America's Cup
 Resolute (schooner), sunk by a German U-boat in 1942

Other uses
 Resolute, a commercial L class blimp
 Resolute Forest Products, a Canadian pulp and paper manufacturer
 G.I. Joe: Resolute, a 2009 American animated television series
 Resolute, a fictional spaceship in the Exofleet of Exosquad

See also
 Scalar resolute or scalar projection
 Vector resolute or vector projection
 Resolute desk, a desk in the White House Oval Office
 Azzam (2013 yacht) (English: Resolute), a superyacht launched in 2013
 Resolutes (disambiguation)